Saudi Arabia is the second biggest tourist destination in the Middle East with over 16 million visiting in 2017. Although most tourism in Saudi Arabia still largely involves religious pilgrimages, there is growth in the leisure tourism sector. As the tourism sector has been largely boosted lately, the sector is expected to be the white oil for Saudi Arabia. This is proved as tourism sector is expected to generate $25 billion in 2019. Potential tourist areas include the Hijaz and Sarawat Mountains, Red Sea diving and a number of ancient ruins.

According to the World Travel and Tourism Council (WTTC), in 2018, Travel and tourism in Saudi Arabia added 9% to the Kingdom’s total economy which is worth $65.2 billion.

In December 2013, Saudi Arabia announced its intention to begin issuing tourist visas for the first time in its history. Council of Ministers entrusted the Saudi Commission for Tourism and Antiquities with visa issuing on the basis of certain regulations approved by the Ministries of Interior and Foreign Affairs. On 27 September 2019, Saudi Arabia formally announced the issuance of the tourist visa to visitors from 49 countries for a fee of $80. The visa can be either obtained online (eVisa) or on arrival. Ten days after the implementation of instant tourist visas,  24,000 foreign visitors entered Saudi Arabia. China visitors topped the list, with the UK and the US in second and third.

Popular places to visit in Saudi Arabia are Makkah, Medina, Mada'in Salih, Yanbu, Tabuk, Jeddah and Riyadh.

Arriving in Saudi Arabia can be through 13 international airports served by various global airlines. There are also 15 domestic airports connecting the country regions and cites. For moving within the country, there are budget airlines like Flynas, Fyadeal, Nesma Airlines, in addition to Saudi Airlines and SaudiGulf Airlines.

Museums

Saudi Arabia has a variety of museum ranging from historical museums, archeological museums, and cultural and scientific museums. These museums are exhibiting the art life, old handicrafts, and antiquities of the Kingdom and including :

National Museum of Saudi Arabia : This is the most famous museum in Saudi Arabia. It is established in 1999 and located in Riyadh as a part of the King Abdulaziz Historical Centre. The museum is highlighting the prominent history of the Arabian Peninsula and its historical role in Islam expanding as well as the history of Saudi Arabia. The Museum holds many ancient manuscripts that are traced back to many ancient civilizations. Indeed Saudi Arabia is considered one of the richest countries in regards of the number of ancient manuscripts.
Al-Zaher Palace Museum: It is a historical museum established in 1944 and exhibits the history of Makkah and various archaeological collections for different periods of Islamic history in the region.
Al-Madinah Museum: It exhibits Al-Madina heritage and history featuring different archaeological collections, visual galleries and rare images that related to Al-Medina. It is also includes the Hejaz Railway Museum. 
Jeddah Regional Museum of Archaeology and Ethnography in Jeddah : it exhibits various collections including artifacts of the stone age back to the Acheulean period, elements illustrating the rise of Islam, and a collection of ethnographic items portraying the modern culture of the region.
Nasseef House in Jeddah : a historical building in Al-Balad, founded in 1872. later, In 2009, it was transformed into a museum and cultural center.
Royal Saudi Air Force Museum in Riyadh : This museum displays the history of the Royal Saudi Air Force.
Masmak fort: is a clay and mud-brick fort, was built around 1865.
 Makkah Antiquities and Heritage Museum: The museum was originally a royal guest house and went by the name of Zaher Palace. It was later converted into a school, followed by which it was converted into a museum.

 Tabuk Castle: is an ancient castle in Tabuk, the capital city of the Tabuk Region in northwestern Saudi Arabia which dates back to 1559. The castle has been rehabilitated and transformed into a museum open to all visitors.
Dammam National Museum is located on the 4th floor of the Dammam Public Library, opposite the Muhammad bin Fahd Stadium on the cross lane from the Dammam-Khobar Highway in Al Toubaishi district. The museum focuses on the country's history, culture, and inhabitants through displays of relics and remnants of handicrafts.
Museum of Buraidah
 Folk Village

 Al Ahsa Museum
The Two Holy Mosques Architecture Exhibition
 Riyadh Zoo

World Heritage Sites

There are five UNESCO World Heritage Sites in Saudi Arabia inscribed from 2008 to 2018., these are as follows :

 Al-Ahsa Oasis : The Al-Ahsa Oasis is a serial property comprising gardens, canals, springs, wells and a drainage lake, as well as historical buildings, urban fabric and archaeological sites.
 Mada'in Salih is a pre-Islamic archaeological site located in the AlUla sector, within the Al Madinah Region of Saudi Arabia. A majority of the vestiges date from the Nabatean kingdom (1st century AD). The site constitutes the kingdom's southernmost and largest settlement after Petra, its capital. Traces of Lihyanite and Roman occupation before and after the Nabatean rule, respectively, can also be found in situ, while accounts from the Qur’an tell of an earlier settlement of the area by the tribe of Thamud in the 3rd millennium BC.
 At-Turaif District in ad-Dir'iyah, a town in Saudi Arabia located on the northwestern outskirts of Riyadh. Diriyah was the original home of the Saudi royal family and served as the capital of the first Saudi dynasty from 1744 to 1818. Today, the town is the seat of the Diriyah Governorate, which also includes the villages of Uyayna, Jubayla, and Al-Ammariyyah, among others, and is part of Ar Riyad Province.
 Historic Jeddah: Historic Jeddah was as a major port for Indian Ocean trade routes, channelling goods to Mecca. It was also the gateway for Muslim pilgrims to Mecca who arrived by sea.
 Rock Art in the Hail Region: This property shows numerous representations of human and animal figures covering 10,000 years of history.

Main festivals and events 

 Jenadriyah: It is an annual cultural and heritage festival held in Jenadriyah near Riyadh. The festival hosts various cultural and heritage events such as Al Janadriya Operetta, Saudi Ardah, and Camel racing.
 Souk Okaz: It is an annual cultural event held in Ta'if. it was known as an open market in the ancient past. Nowadays, Souk Okaz combines more than 150 attractions of heritage and cultural events, theatre performances, and arts and crafts.
Historic Jeddah Festival : is a celebration that takes place in the historical Al Balad district of Jeddah. The festival exhibits the culture and heritage of Jeddah.
“Winter at Tantora” festival : an annual festival held in the old town of AlUla, in northwestern Saudi Arabia.
 Ha’il International Rally
Al Qassim Date Festival : is the largest date festival in the world held in the central Qassim region of Saudi Arabia.
King Abdulaziz Falconry Festival  is an international festival organized by the Saudi Falcons Club and witnesses the participation of a group of falcon owners in the Kingdom and the Gulf Cooperation Council.
Riyadh Season: is a six-month long entertainment festival that includes a wide range of entertainment events from international concerts, sport events, Michelin star restaurants and family-oriented activities such as Winter Wonderland.

Religious tourism

Tourism in Saudi Arabia still largely involves religious pilgrimages. Mecca receives over three million pilgrims a year during the month of Dhu al-Hijjah in Hajj, and around two million during the month of Ramadan to perform Umrah. During the rest of the year, Mecca receives around four million for Umrah. The Hajj, or pilgrimage to the city, is one of the five pillars of Islam. Only Muslims are permitted in Mecca.

Saudi Seasons 

It is a nation-wide tourism initiative that aims at attracting local and international tourists. The seasons are organized in many Saudi cities at different times throughout the year.

There are currently 11 seasons as follows:

 Riyadh season.
 Jeddah season.
 Eastern province season.
 Taif season.
 Al Soudah season.
 National Day season.
 Al-Diriyah season.
 Al-Ula season.
 Hail season.
 Ramadan season.
 Eid Al-Fitr season.

Other sites
Red Sea is being developed as a beach resort where women can wear bikinis. The construction began in 2019. The Red Sea is one of the seven wonders of the underwater world.  Known for its beautiful coral reefs and abundant marine life, it is listed as one of the best diving locations in the world.

Arrivals by country

Most visitors arriving in Saudi Arabia on a short term basis were from the following countries:

Future prospects 
By 2019, the domestic tourism is planned to increase by 8% and the international tourism is expected to increase to 5.6%. Saudi Arabia’s overall number of tourist trips is on course to be 93.8 million by 2023, up from 64.7 million in 2018. Riyadh and Jeddah hosted Color Runs in late 2019. Hotels are no longer required to ask Saudi couples for proof of marriage for a check-in. The government is spending billions on bringing forms of entertainment such as wrestling, tennis, car racing, expensive restaurants and concerts to expand tourism.

Promotion

Lionel Messi as ambassador 
The Kingdom of Saudi Arabia signed Argentine professional footballer and Paris Saint-Germain forward, Lionel Messi, as its tourism ambassador in May 2022. Messi was signed by Saudi Arabia as its ambassador during a trip he made to the country’s port city of Jeddah, along the Red Sea. Saudi’s Minister of Tourism, Ahmed Al Khateeb officially announced the signing in a tweet by writing, “This is not his first visit to the kingdom and it will not be the last”, indicating the footballer’s future visits to Saudi for promoting its tourism.  The news received critical reactions from media and human rights groups calling it Saudi Arabia’s use of sports to improve its reputation.

In August 2022, Messi was reached out by the family of a 15-year-old boy who was arrested in Saudi Arabia and charged with a death sentence. The family wrote a letter requesting Messi to intervene in the case of Mohammed al Faraj, who was arrested in 2017 for allegedly committing crime against the Saudi regime. Whereas, the family of the young man claimed that he was tortured into confessing for the crimes, he did not commit. Reprieve, the human rights organization working with the family on the case also claimed Saudi Arabia as using sport to launder its reputation.

See also

 Visa policy of Saudi Arabia
Saudi Seasons
Public Decency Law in Saudi Arabia

References

External links

 Visit Saudi Seasons
 Official tourism website
 Saudi Arabia Business Visa Checklists
 Saudi Commission for Tourism and Antiquities
 Traveler's Information by the Royal Embassy of Saudi Arabia in Washington, D.C.
 Official restaurant directory and dining guide of Saudi Arabia
 ExperienceAlUla.com

 
Saudi Arabia